Depew station was a Lehigh Valley Railroad station in Depew, New York, a suburb of Buffalo. It was the first station east of Niagara Junction, where Lehigh Valley trains left the Buffalo–Jersey City, New Jersey main line for Tonawanda, New York, and thence to Niagara Falls. Passengers heading for Toronto, Ontario would transfer at Depew. The station also handled Canada-bound freight; replacing an interchange operation with the New York Central Railroad at Batavia.

The station was located on the west side of Transit Road (New York State Route 78), adjacent to the New York Central main line.

Service to Depew ended on February 4, 1961, with the end of passenger service on the Lehigh Valley, the final train being the Maple Leaf.

Notes

References 
 
 

Former Lehigh Valley Railroad stations
Depew
Railway stations closed in 1961
Demolished railway stations in the United States
1961 disestablishments in New York (state)
Former railway stations in New York (state)